The New South Wales Institute of Sport (NSWIS) is a high performance sports training institute located in New South Wales, Australia. The New South Wales government agency provides world leading coaching, performance support and daily training environments to support targeted athletes achieve podium performances. In conjunction with a holistic approach to athlete welfare, career and educational assistance, the NSWIS supports and develops targeted elite and emerging athletes to achieve their highest potential.

Located at Sydney Olympic Park, in Sydney, the institute was established as a statutory body under the Institute of Sport Act, 1995, following a review recommending central coordination and monitoring of high performance sports programs in New South Wales. Operations officially commenced in 1996. During 2021, the institute developed 564 athletes, across 46 sports in 18 programs. The services ensure that NSWIS athletes have access to coaching and sports technology while also receiving tailored support to help balance their sporting commitments with personal development and a career.

The agency is responsible to the Minister for Tourism and Sport, presently The Hon. Stuart Ayres . Ultimately, the minister is responsible to the Parliament of New South Wales.

Structure 
The institute offers support to athletes across the following nine areas:
 Athlete Wellbeing and Engagement
 Biomechanics
 Coaching
 Corporate and Communications
 Nutrition
 Performance Analysis
 Performance Health
 Performance Psychology
 Physiology
 Research
 Sports Management
 Strength and Conditioning

Under the institute's Mobile/Regional program, the NSWIS offers support services to NSWIS athletes in their home environment, enabling them to pursue their sporting careers with minimal disruption to their family, education and employment.

The institute's principal partner was ClubsNSW, who provided 1 million a year in sponsorship.

Sports
The NSWIS runs programs in a number of sports with the objective of preparing young athletes for national and international competition. , programs are run in the following sports:

Athletics, including wheelchair track & road 
Basketball and wheelchair basketball
Canoeing
Cycling
Diving
Field hockey
Rowing
Sailing
Surfing
Swimming
Triathlon
Water polo
Winter sports

See also
 Football NSW National Training Centre

References

External links
NSWIS website
NSWIS newsroom

 
Sport in New South Wales
Australian Institute of Sport
Sports institutes in Australia